Martin Andrew Hanley (10 November 1918 – 2 June 2000) was a South African cricketer who played in one Test in 1949.

Hanley was a right-handed lower-order batsman and a right-arm off-break bowler. His single Test was the third match of the 1948-49 England tour series and he was the third spin bowler alongside Tufty Mann and Athol Rowan, with Rowan also bowling off-spin. He took just one wicket in the game and was dropped for the next match, being replaced by leg-spinner Fish Markham.

His nephew, Rupert Hanley, also played first-class cricket.

References

1918 births
2000 deaths
People from Aliwal North
South African people of British descent
South Africa Test cricketers
South African cricketers
Border cricketers
Western Province cricketers
Cricketers from the Eastern Cape